Colin O'Brien (8 May 1940 – 19 August 2016) was a British street photographer. He began documenting life in London in the 1950s and continued to do so for over 60 years, leaving behind a photographic archive of around half a million negatives. His notable publications are London Life (2015) and Travellers' Children in London Fields (2013).

Publications by O'Brien
Retrospective Images. London: Pentagram Design, 2000. .
Abstract Realities: Images of 20th Century Industrial Design London: The London Institute, 2001. .
Travellers' Children in London Fields. London: Spitalfields Life Books, 2013. Edited by The Gentle Author.
65. London: They That Do, 2014. . Edition of 1500 copies. "65 images spanning 65 years".
Boxed edition. London: They That Do, 2014. Included a print and a set of 10 postcards. Edition of 400 copies.
London Life. London: Spitalfields Life Books, 2015. .

Exhibitions

Solo exhibitions
Retrospective Images, Aberystwyth Arts Centre, Aberystwyth, Wales, May 2007.
Travellers' Children, Genesis Cinema, Stepney, London, 2012.
Travellers' Children in London Fields, Agnès b., Marylebone High Street, London, November–December 2013.
London Life, Hackney Museum, Mare Street, London, June–Sept 2014.
Leica Store City gallery, The Royal Exchange, London, 2015.
London Life, The Society Club, Soho, London, June–August 2015.
East London Life, Unit G Gallery, Hackney, London, July–August 2015.
This England, Unit G Gallery, Hackney, London, October 2016.
Decisive Moments (international retrospective), Unit G Gallery, Hanbury Hall, London, July–August 2017.

Exhibitions with others
London Street Photography: 1860-2010, Museum of London, London, February–September 2011. Travelled to the Museum of the City of New York, July–December 2012.
Playing In or Out?, V&A Museum of Childhood, Bethnal Green, London, March–November 2012. Film and photographs by O'Brien, Alec Brooking and John Heywood.
Whitechapel: a Look Back, Darnley Gallery, Centre for Better Health, Hackney, London, part of Photomonth East London International Photography Festival, October 2014. Photographs by O'Brien and Alex Pink "taken before, during and immediately after the 2012 London Olympic Games."

Collections
O'Brien's work is held in the following public collections:
Museum of London, London
Hackney Museum, London

References

External links

Obituary by O'Brien's publisher at Spitalfields Life Books
Colin O' Brien - 65, documentary by Aaron Kyle (video)
Colin O'Brien Traveller's Children in London Fields (video)
London Life gallery of photographs at The Daily Telegraph
65: by Colin O’Brien—Publication, exhibition, curation, production at the book's designers, That They Do

1940 births
2016 deaths
Street photographers
People from Clerkenwell
20th-century British photographers
21st-century British photographers
Photographers from London